France Gélinas is a politician in Ontario, Canada. She is a New Democratic member of the Legislative Assembly of Ontario who was elected in 2007. She represents the riding of Nickel Belt.

Background
Gélinas was born and raised in Shawinigan, Quebec.  She is trained as a physiotherapist and has been the executive director of the Community Health Centre of Sudbury, on the United Way's Citizens' Advisory Panel, served as president of the Francophone Reference Group of the Northern Ontario School of Medicine. She lives in the Naughton neighborhood of Sudbury with her family.

Politics
She ran in the 2007 provincial election as the New Democratic candidate in the riding of Nickel Belt. She defeated Liberal candidate Ron Dupuis by 2,762 votes. She was re-elected in the 2011, 2014 and 2022 elections.

In May 2008, she joined caucus colleagues Michael Prue and Peter Tabuns in calling on the provincial government to crack down on private hydroelectricity marketers.

She has been an outspoken critic of competitive bidding in the province's home care services, and of layoffs affecting nurses in provincial hospitals.

Following the announcement of Howard Hampton's retirement as leader of the Ontario New Democratic Party, there was some speculation in Sudbury's local media that Gélinas might join the leadership campaign. However, she indicated on June 16, 2008 that as a relatively new MPP, she did not feel that she was ready to become a leadership candidate. She later endorsed Gilles Bisson for the leadership, and supported the eventual winner, Andrea Horwath, on the final ballot at the convention.

In 2009, Gélinas introduced the Healthy Decisions for Healthy Eating bill, a private member's bill which would mandate the provision of nutritional and calorie information on restaurant menus. In 2011, she introduced a private member's bill to have the provincial Commissioner of French Language Services report to the full Legislative Assembly of Ontario, rather than exclusively to the Minister of Francophone Affairs.

In 2014 she was re-elected with 62.66% of the vote, the highest percent of any MPP in Ontario that year.

In 2015, Gélinas introduced a private member's bill to mandate the creation of a fully independent French-language university in Ontario.

She is currently the party's critic for Health and Long-Term Care, and francophone affairs in the NDP's shadow cabinet.

Electoral Record

References

External links 
 
 

Franco-Ontarian people
Living people
Ontario New Democratic Party MPPs
Politicians from Greater Sudbury
Canadian physiotherapists
Women MPPs in Ontario
21st-century Canadian politicians
21st-century Canadian women politicians
People from Shawinigan
Year of birth missing (living people)